Gambi is a surname. It may refer to:

People
Gambi (rapper) (born 1999), French rapper
Gianni Gambi (also Giovanni; 1907–1986), Italian swimmer
Vincenzo Gambi (died 1819), Italian pirate

Fictional characters
Paul Gambi, a fictional tailor appearing in comic published by DC Comics
Peter Gambi, a fictional character appearing in comics published by DC Comics